E
This is a list of current professional women boxing rankings, which includes the latest rankings by each one of the sport's four major sanctioning bodies, as well as other well-regarded sites and entities.

Overview 
As professional boxing has four major sanctioning bodies (WBA, WBC, IBF, WBO) each with their own champions, the sport doesn't have a centralized ranking system. The rankings published by these organizations share the trait of not ranking the other organizations' champions, as each one of the sanctioning bodies expects their champion to frequently defend their title against their top-ranked contender. The WBA often has more than one champion, none of which are ranked by the other 3 sanctioning bodies. Their "Super" and "Regular" champions are excluded from the rankings but their "Interim" champion is affixed to the #1 spot. The IBF's protocol is for the top 2 spots in its rankings to remain vacant until two of its other top-ranked contenders face off, at which point the winner takes one of those two places.

In addition to the rankings published by the major sanctioning bodies, The Ring publish their own independent rankings, not excluding any organizations' champions. The aim of The Ring is to crown a single champion for each division. Every single one of these lists are assembled by a committee but since the 90s, other parties have experimented with computerized rankings, but these are sometimes regarded as incapable of accounting for all of boxing's quirks and subtleties. The most widely known computerized rankings are published by BoxRec and updated daily. The following is a list compiling the latest instalment of all the previously mentioned rankings.

Current boxing rankings

Heavyweight

Light heavyweight

Super middleweight

Middleweight

Light middleweight

Welterweight

Light welterweight

Lightweight

Super featherweight

Featherweight

Super bantamweight

Bantamweight

Super flyweight

Flyweight

Light flyweight

Mini flyweight

Atomweight

See also
List of current female world boxing champions

References

External links

 WBA rankings
 WBC rankings
 IBF rankings
 IBO rankings

 BoxRec rankings
 The Ring rankings

Boxing
Women Rankings
Women's sport-related lists